The list of number-one digital songs of 2018 in the United States are based upon the highest-selling downloaded songs ranked in the Digital Song Sales chart, published by Billboard magazine. The data are compiled by Nielsen SoundScan based on each single's weekly digital sales, which combines sales of different versions of a song by an act for a summarized figure.

Chart history

References

External links
Current Digital Songs chart

United States Digital Songs
2018
Number-one digital songs